"River" is a 2022 single by Polish-American singer Ochman. The song represented Poland in the Eurovision Song Contest 2022 in Turin, Italy after winning , Poland's national final.

Eurovision Song Contest

Tu bije serce Europy! Wybieramy hit na Eurowizję
TVP opened a submission period for interested artists and songwriters to submit their entries between 20 September 2021 and 20 November 2021. The broadcaster received 150 submissions at the closing of the deadline. A five-member selection committee consisting of a representative of TVP, a radio personality, a music expert, a journalist and a representative of the Polish Musicians Union selected ten entries from the received submissions to compete in the national final. The selected entries were announced on 14 January 2022 during the TVP2 programme .

The final took place on February 19, 2022. Ten entries would compete, and the winner was determined over two rounds of voting. The top three most voted songs would proceed to the superfinal round, where all votes would be reset and the winner would be determined. Both rounds would use a 50/50 combination of votes from a professional jury and a public vote.

"River" would move on to be one of the three songs in the superfinal, which it won. As a result, the song represented Poland in the Eurovision Song Contest 2022.

At Eurovision
According to Eurovision rules, all nations with the exceptions of the host country and the "Big Five" (France, Germany, Italy, Spain and the United Kingdom) are required to qualify from one of two semi-finals in order to compete for the final; the top ten countries from each semi-final progress to the final. The European Broadcasting Union (EBU) split up the competing countries into six different pots based on voting patterns from previous contests, with countries with favourable voting histories put into the same pot. On 25 January 2022, an allocation draw was held which placed each country into one of the two semi-finals, as well as which half of the show they would perform in. Poland was placed into the second semi-final, held on 12 May 2022, and performed in the second half of the show, 14th out of 18th countries.

Track listing

Charts

Certifications

References 

2022 songs
2022 singles
Eurovision songs of Poland
Eurovision songs of 2022
Songs written by Ashley Hicklin
Universal Music Group singles